Joseph Thomas Marsden (11 October 1868 – 17 January 1897) was an English footballer who played for Darwen and Everton. He also earned one cap for the English national side in 1891.

External links
Player profile at EnglandStats.com

1868 births
English footballers
England international footballers
Darwen F.C. players
1897 deaths
Everton F.C. players
Association football fullbacks
Padiham F.C. players